Mangum is a surname. Notable people with the surname include:

Crystal Mangum, American woman who perpetrated the 2006 Duke University lacrosse rape hoax and later murdered her partner
Dusty Mangum,  American football player, placekicker
Jake Mangum, American baseball player
Jeff Mangum, American musician and songwriter
John Mangum (disambiguation)
Jonathan Mangum, American actor and comedian
Kris Mangum, American football player, tight end
Pete Mangum (1931–2000), American football player
Tanner Mangum, American college football player, quarterback
Willie Person Mangum, American politician